Earl Leon Gant (born July 6, 1957) is a former American football running back in the National Football League who played for the Kansas City Chiefs. He played college football for the Missouri Tigers. He also played in the USFL for the Birmingham Stallions.

References

1957 births
Living people
American football running backs
Kansas City Chiefs players
Birmingham Stallions players
Missouri Tigers football players